Alkaline phosphatase, placental type also known as placental alkaline phosphatase (PLAP) is an allosteric enzyme that in humans is encoded by the ALPP gene.

Gene 

There are at least four distinct but related alkaline phosphatases: intestinal (ALPI), placental (this enzyme), placental-like (ALPPL2), and liver/bone/kidney (ALPL) (tissue-nonspecific). The first three are located together on chromosome 2, whereas the tissue-nonspecific form is located on chromosome 1.  The coding sequence for this form of alkaline phosphatase is unique in that the 3' untranslated region contains multiple copies of an Alu family repeat. In addition, this gene is polymorphic and three common alleles (type 1, type 2, and type 3) for this form of alkaline phosphatase have been well-characterized.

Function 

Alkaline phosphatase, placental type is a membrane-bound glycosylated dimeric enzyme, also referred to as the heat-stable form, that is expressed primarily in the placenta, although it is closely related to the intestinal form of the enzyme as well as to the placental-like form.

Clinical significance 

PLAP is a tumor marker, especially in seminoma and ovarian cancer (e.g., dysgerminoma). PLAP is reliable only in non-smokers, as smoking interferes with measurement of PLAP, since serum concentrations of PLAP are increased up to 10-fold in smokers and its measurement is therefore of little value in this group.

References

Further reading